The Lords Temporal are secular members of the House of Lords, the upper house of the British Parliament. These can be either life peers or hereditary peers, although the hereditary right to sit in the House of Lords was abolished for all but ninety-two peers during the 1999 reform of the House of Lords. The term is used to differentiate these members from the Lords Spiritual, who sit in the House as a consequence of being bishops in the Church of England.

History 

Membership in the Lords Temporal was once an entitlement of all hereditary peers, other than those in the peerage of Ireland. Under the House of Lords Act 1999, the right to membership was restricted to 92 hereditary peers. Since 2020, none of them are female; most hereditary peerages can be inherited only by men.

Further reform of the House of Lords is a perennially-discussed issue in British politics. However, no additional legislation on this issue has passed the House of Commons since 1999. The Wakeham Commission, which debated the issue of lords' reform under then Prime Minister Tony Blair, proposed making some of the Lords Temporal elected positions. This plan, which was widely criticized, failed to advance in the House of Commons. Additional proposals were made under the coalition government of Prime Minister David Cameron to reduce the size of the House of Lords to 450, directly elect at least some of the Lords Temporal, and allow members of the House of Commons to run for election as Lords Temporal. None of these proposals passed.

Composition of the Lords Temporal 

The Lords Temporal consist of a small number of hereditary peers and a much larger contingent of life peers.

Hereditary peers 
The Lords Temporal has historically included several hundred hereditary peers (English peers as well as Scottish Lords of Parliament). Such hereditary offices can be created by the Crown and in modern times are usually created only under the advice of the Prime Minister.

Holders of Scottish and Irish peerages were not always permitted to sit in the Lords. When Scotland united with England to form Great Britain in 1707, it was provided that the Scottish hereditary peers would only be able to elect 16 representative peers to sit in the House of Lords; the term of a representative was to extend until the next general election. A similar provision was enacted when Ireland merged with Great Britain in 1801 to form the United Kingdom; the Irish peers were allowed to elect 28 representatives, who were to retain office for life. Elections for Irish representatives ended in 1922, when most of Ireland became an independent state; elections for Scottish representatives ended with the passage of the Peerage Act 1963, under which all Scottish peers obtained seats in the Upper House.

After the 1999 reform, only 92 hereditary peers remain as Lords Temporal. Two are the Earl Marshal and the Lord Great Chamberlain. Of the remaining ninety peers sitting in the Lords by virtue of a hereditary peerage, 15 are elected by the whole House and 75 are chosen by fellow hereditary peers in the House of Lords, grouped by party.

Life peers 

The largest group of Lords Temporal, and indeed of the whole House, are life peers. As of February 2023 there are 665 life peers. Life peerages rank only as barons or baronesses, and are created under the Life Peerages Act 1958. Like all other peers, life peers are created by the Crown, who acts on the advice of the Prime Minister or the House of Lords Appointments Commission. By convention, however, the Prime Minister allows leaders of other parties to nominate some life peers, to maintain political equilibrium.

In 2000, the government announced it would set up an Independent Appointments Commission, under Lord Stevenson of Coddenham, to select fifteen so-called "people's peers" for life peerages.

Defunct groupings

Law lords 

Until the establishment of the Supreme Court in 2009, a subset of the Lords Temporal – known as the Law Lords – acted as the final court of appeal in the United Kingdom judicial system. These lords became the first justices of the UK Supreme Court.

Citations 

House of Lords
Constitution of the United Kingdom